Scopula rubrocinctata is a moth of the family Geometridae. It is found in Brazil and Peru.

References

Moths described in 1858
rubrocinctata
Moths of South America